Selaginella carinata is a species of plant in the Selaginellaceae family. It is endemic to Ecuador.  Its natural habitat is subtropical or tropical moist montane forests and it is threatened by habitat loss.

References

carinata
Flora of Ecuador
Vulnerable plants
Taxonomy articles created by Polbot